A list of films produced in France in 1932:

List

See also
 1932 in France

References

External links
 French films of 1932 at the Internet Movie Database
 French films of 1932 at Cinema-francais.fr

1932
Films
Lists of 1932 films by country or language